The Foundation for Defense of Democracies (FDD) is a 501(c)(3) non-profit think tank and registered lobbying organization based in Washington, D.C., United States.

The group's political leanings have been described as hawkish and neoconservative, though it is officially nonpartisan.  FDD publishes research on foreign policy and security issues, focusing on subjects such as nuclear-non proliferation, cyber threats, sanctions, illicit finance, and policy surrounding North Korea, Iran, Russia, the war in Afghanistan, and other areas of study.

FDD has been identified as part of the Israel lobby in the United States.

History and mission 
FDD was founded shortly after the September 11 attacks in 2001. In the initial documents filed for tax-exempt status in Internal Revenue Service, the FDD stated its mission "was to provide education to enhance Israel's image in North America and the public's understanding of issues affecting Israeli-Arab relations". Later documents described the mission as "to conduct research and provide education on international terrorism and related issues".

On its website, FDD describes itself as "a non-profit, non-partisan 501(c)3 policy institute", with focus "on foreign policy and national security that combines policy research, democracy and counterterrorism education, strategic communications and investigative journalism in support of its mission to promote pluralism, defend democratic values and fight the ideologies that drive terrorism".

FDD has been identified as part of the Israel lobby in the United States by several scholarly sources. Sima Vaknin-Gil, director general of Israel's Ministry of Strategic Affairs, had stated that the FDD works in conjunction with the Israeli government including the ministry. Later documents described the mission as "to conduct research and provide education on international terrorism and related issues".

On 15 November 2019, FDD was officially registered as a lobby under Lobbying Disclosure Act of 1995.

Funding 
According to former U.S. ambassador Dennis Jett, FDD "offers hardly any information on where its money comes from and where it goes".

2001–2004 

In 2011, news website ThinkProgress published FDD's Form 990 documents that revealed the source of FDD's funds between 2001 and 2004. Top donors included:
Roland Arnall: $1,802,000
Edgar M. and Charles Bronfman: $1,050,000
Michael Steinhardt: $850,000
 Abramson Family Foundation (of Leonard Abramson): $822,523
Bernard Marcus: $600,000
Lewis Ranieri: $350,000
Other notable donors:
Haim Saban
Jennifer Laszlo Mizrahi
Douglas J. Feith

2008–2011 
FDD's Schedule A documents filed by the end of the 2011 tax year, indicates that the organization from 2008 to 2011 was funded more than $20,000,000, and the top three donors were:
Bernard Marcus: $10,745,000
Paul Singer: $3,600,000
Sheldon Adelson: $1,510,059

2017 
In 2018, AP reported that the United Arab Emirates has wired $2,500,000 to the FDD through Elliott Broidy and George Nader, to host a conference amidst Qatar diplomatic crisis about the country's role as a state-sponsor of terrorism. FDD stated that it does not accept money from foreign governments, adding that "[a]s is our funding policy, we asked if his funding was connected to any foreign governments or if he had business contracts in the Gulf. He assured us that he did not".

Adam Hanieh states that the FDD high-profile conference of 23 May 2017 was in line with UAE's policy at the time, which officially alleged that Qatar finances Islamist groups, adding that emails leaked shortly after show that UAE's Ambassador Yousef Al Otaiba had a "cosy relationship" with the FDD, and had reviewed the remarks made by Robert Gates at the convention. Qatar appeared to be in compliance with the terms of the agreement for countering terrorism and not supporting extremists from its territory according to the report published by The Washington Post in February 2021. According to documents obtained by Al Arabiya published on July 10, 2017, Qatar had agreed to stop providing support to the Muslim Brotherhood, expelled non-citizen Brothers from Qatar, and would not shelter any persons from GCC countries to avoid undermining relations with the Gulf.

Others 
Additionally, it is known that as of 2016, FDD has received donations from the following institutions:

 Abstraction Fund
 Hertog Foundation
 Jacobson Family Foundation
 Klarman Family Foundation
 Koret Foundation
 Milstein Family Foundation
 Nathan Seter Foundation
 Newton and Rochelle Becker Charitable Trust
 Snider Foundation

 Hochberg Family Foundation
 Marcus Foundation
 Bodman Foundation
 Emerson Family Foundation
 Eris & Larry Field Family Foundation
 Rita & Irwin Hochberg Family Foundation
 Anchorage Charitable Fund
 William Rosenwald Family Fund
 Lynde and Harry Bradley Foundation

Activities

The Iran Project
FDD and its CEO, Mark Dubowitz, have been sanctioned by Iran for advocating sanctions against Iran and working to end the Iranian nuclear deal.

FDD's Iran Program is led by CEO Mark Dubowitz.

In 2008, FDD founded the Iran Energy Project which "conducts extensive research on ways to deny the Iranian regime the profits of its energy sector". The Wall Street Journal credited FDD with bringing "the idea of gasoline sanctions to political attention."  The organization pushed for sanctions against the Central Bank of the Islamic Republic of Iran and its use of Society for Worldwide Interbank Financial Telecommunication (SWIFT) to perform transactions.

The Syria Project
For years, Syria has been a focus of FDD's research because of its alignment with Iran and support for organizations such as Hezbollah. In 2012, as the Arab Spring spread to Syria, FDD launched "The Syria Project" to support dissident efforts in removing Syrian president Bashar al-Assad from power. In that effort, FDD facilitated a Skype call between dissidents and U.S. journalists in 2012.

Long War Journal

The Long War Journal is a FDD project dedicated to reporting the Global War on Terror launched by the United States and its allies following the attacks of September 11, 2001. Under the direction of FDD senior fellows Bill Roggio and Thomas Joscelyn, this website covers stories about countries such as Afghanistan, Pakistan, Somalia, Syria, and Iraq and follows the actions of al Qaeda and its affiliates. According to the Columbia Journalism Review, "Roggio's greatest service, then, may be the way he picks up where the mainstream press leaves off, giving readers a simultaneously more specific and holistic understanding of the battlefield", but says that "...there have been times when Roggio has done himself a disservice by aligning with bloggers who are more about pushing a conservative agenda."

When it was announced in October 2021 that President Joe Biden's top diplomat for Afghanistan, Zalmay Khalilzad, was stepping down, Bill Roggio of the FDD said, "It is about time he stopped stealing money from the US government. He shoulders a large amount of the blame for shilling for the Taliban."

European Foundation for Democracy

Personnel

Executives 
 Clifford May, President
 Mark Dubowitz, CEO
 Toby Dershowitz, Senior Vice President for Government Relations and Strategy
 Tyler Stapleton, Deputy for Congressional Relations
 John Hannah, Senior Counselor
 Bill McCarthy, COO
 Lawrence Muscant, Senior Vice President 
 Jonathan Schanzer, Vice President for Research
Former staff include:
 Nir Boms (President)

Board of directors 
As of 2005, members of FDD's board of directors were: 
Steve Forbes
Jack Kemp
Jeane Kirkpatrick

Advisors 
The following people served as advisors to FDD as of 2005:
 Newt Gingrich
 James Woolsey
 Bill Kristol
 Richard Perle

Fellows 
 Walid Phares
 Michael Ledeen
 Emanuele Ottolenghi
 Olli Heinonen
 Orde Kittrie

Criticism
Arun Kundnani, adjunct professor at New York University, in a review of FDD publication Homegrown Terrorists in the US and UK argues that as a work "typical of many in its approach and conclusions", it does not provide empirical evidence for assumptions it makes and neglects contradicting data as a result of an influence by politics of the publisher and funders, and bias in favor of knowledge claims.

Lawrence Wilkerson has criticized FDD for "pushing falsehood" in support of waging wars.

The International Relations Center features a report on the foundation on its "Right Web" website, a program of the think tank Institute for Policy Studies which, according to its mission statement, seeks to "check the militaristic drift of the country". The report states that "although the FDD is an ardent critic of terrorism, it has not criticized actions taken by Israel against Palestinians that arguably fall into this category".

The left-leaning political blog ThinkProgress has criticized FDD for "alarmist rhetoric and fear mongering", for example in April 2002 when they aired a 30-second television ad campaign called "Suicide Strategy" that was described by critics as "conflating" Palestinian leader Yasser Arafat with the likes of Osama bin Laden and Saddam Hussein. As FDD explained it: "a militant Islamic terrorist who 'martyrs' himself by hijacking a plane and flying it into the World Trade Center"—referring to the September 11 attacks—"is no different from a militant Islamic terrorist who 'martyrs' himself by strapping explosives to his body and walking into a hotel"—i.e., Palestinian suicide attacks.

In 2017 Bari Weiss of the New York Times reported on dissent within the organization over the pro-Trump orientation it adopted following the 2016 elections, which included at least two employees leaving.

The Ministry of Foreign Affairs of the Islamic Republic of Iran has designated the Foundation for Defense of Democracies as a terrorist organization.

Islamophobia accusations
Christopher A. Bail, professor of sociology, public policy and data science at Duke University, describes FDD as an "anti-Muslim fringe organization" that has tried to establish itself as a legitimate authority on Islam and terrorism by tactically using "ethnic experts" —i.e. pundits	with Middle Eastern background who were not Muslim— because they advocate views contrary to the mainstream perspective of the Muslim community in the United States, but look like and talk like Muslims.

Sarah Marusek, research fellow at University of Johannesburg, argues that FDD is one of the "key organizations peddling Islamophobia" in a "transatlantic network". Farid Hafez, researcher at Universität Salzburg, asserts the same.

References

External links

Think tanks established in 2001
2001 establishments in Washington, D.C.
Think tanks based in Washington, D.C.
Foreign policy and strategy think tanks in the United States
Political and economic think tanks in the United States
Lobbying organizations based in Washington, D.C.
Conservative organizations in the United States
Neoconservatism
Organisations designated as terrorist by Iran